The Bayer designation Xi Centauri (ξ Cen / ξ Centauri) is shared by two star systems, in the constellation Centaurus:
 ξ¹ Centauri
 ξ² Centauri
They are separated by 0.66° on the sky.

Centauri, Xi
Centaurus (constellation)